Harry Robert Graham (20 February 1850 – 11 January 1933) was Conservative MP for St Pancras West.

He stood unsuccessfully in 1886, won it from the Liberals in 1892, held it in 1895 and 1900, but lost it back to the Liberals in 1906.

Personal life
His father was John Benjamin Graham.  He studied at the University of Oxford.  He never married.

Sources

Whitaker's Almanack, 1887 to 1910 editions
Craig, F.W.S. British Parliamentary Election Results 1855-1913

Conservative Party (UK) MPs for English constituencies
Politics of the London Borough of Camden
1850 births
1933 deaths
Alumni of Exeter College, Oxford